"Not Forgotten" is the first single released by the electronic group Leftfield; however, Paul Daley was not involved in the song's creation.  The song was written by Neil Barnes and released only on 12" in 1990 on the Outer Rhythm record label, published by Rhythm King Music.

Background
"Not Forgotten" served as Leftfiled's debut single. Within four years of its release, "Not Forgotten" saw them become the most influential production team working in British dance music. It opened up a generation of DJs and record producers to dub and tribal percussion while inadvertently creating progressive house along the way.

Reception
Mixmag praised the seminal single as an important step forward for British house music. The magazine declared, "If any one record could be said to be responsible for finally making British house more respectable than its American and European cousins, 'Not Forgotten' was it. No longer would British house heads be constantly looking over their shoulders at New York, Ghent, Milan and Berlin. 'Not Forgotten' and subsequent Leftfield classics like 'Release the Pressure' and 'Song of Life' were the cement that welded a whole new British house scene together. London proudly joined the league of house capitals. British dance music has never looked back."

Track listing
Vinyl 12"
 Side A – "Not Forgotten" – 6:40
 Side B1 – "Not Forgotten" (Fateh's on the Case) – 6:13
 Side B2 – "Not Forgotten" (Dub) – 4:48

References

1990 songs
1990 debut singles
Leftfield songs